Escape to Reality is the second studio album by din fiv, released on May 23, 2000 by Metropolis Records. The album was re-issued by Metropolis Records on compact disc in June 1996 and again as music downloads in 2009 and 2019.

Reception 

Kenyon Hopkin of AllMusic said if "it weren't for the coasting strings in the background of every track, Escape to Reality may have wound up as an average entry in industrial dance" and that "it functions as a cold yet soothing texture that brings a full sound to Din Fiv's second release. Industrial Reviews awarded the album four out of five stars and praised Din's ability to merge complex and multi-layered synthesizers created atmospheres while maintaining a strong sense of unity and melody throughout the album. Last Sigh Magazine praised the production quality and said "the music is rather simple, basslines are strong and powerful, and there are plenty of effects." Metal.de commended the music for having memorable vocal lines and samples and called the album typical for its genre. Sonic Boom criticized the album for sounding monotonous and called it "an album that remains very consistent and flat without much deviation outside the standard electro model" and "in most cases, this doesn't inherently a negative issue, but in this case it is extremely difficult to locate a track that stands out from the rest on this album." The album peaked at number fifteen on CMJ New Music Monthly's top dance releases in 2000.

Track listing

Accolades

Personnel
Adapted from the Escape to Reality liner notes.

din_fiv
 David Din (as Da5id Din) – vocals, instruments, engineering

Additional performers
 Adam Jensen – additional production
 Jason Macierowski – guitar (10)
 Tyler Newman – remixer (10)
 Evan Sornstein – engineering and remixer (9), cover art, illustrations, design

Production and design
 Josh Greco – engineering (10)
 Susan Jennings – photography

Release history

References

External links 
 
 Escape to Reality at Bandcamp

2000 albums
Din fiv albums
Metropolis Records albums